The Northern Subdivision is a railroad line owned by CSX Transportation in the U.S. states of Kentucky and Ohio. At its south end the line continues north from the Russell Subdivision and at its north end the line continues north as the Columbus Subdivision of the Great Lakes Division.

See also
 List of CSX Transportation lines

References

CSX Transportation lines
Transportation in Greenup County, Kentucky